Five Seconds Flat (stylized in all lowercase) is the second studio album by American singer-songwriter Lizzy McAlpine, released on April 8, 2022, by Harbour Artists & Music in association with the AWAL music distribution company.

Reviews 
According to the collection of reviews on Albumoftheyear, the album received a user score of 77/100 and a critic score of 75/100.

According to the review of the British music magazine DORK who gave the album a rating of 4 out of 5 stars "the album is all flashes of clean white sheets, sunlight coming through the blinds, first stirring of your coffee in the morning... Over the course of the album, the 22-year-old finds herself traversing through gut-punching heartbreak: each track feels like another step on tentative feet."

Five Seconds Flat, the Film
With the release of the album, McAlpine also released a film on April 8, 2022. The film is available to watch on Lizzy McAlpine's official YouTube channel.

All but 2 of the album's songs appear in the film. McAlpine came up with the whole idea for the film and the plot by herself. "I had whole pages of complex explanations about the meaning of the film", she said in a questionnaire after the screening of the film. She came up with the idea of ​​the skeletons in the film "because I feel that heartbreak is like a small death".

The idea in this metaphor is that every time she feels heartbroken she dies all over again. So every time in the movie she feels heartbroken she has skeleton makeup.

Track listing

Notes 
 All track titles are stylized in all lowercase.
  signifies an additional producer

Five Seconds Flat, the tour 

With the release of the album came the tour that was announced on social networks on April 7, 2022 and took place from June 8, 2022 to November 25, 2022. The tour had 26 shows in North America and 10 shows in Europe. In most the performances during the tour, the opening act was the singer Carol Ades.

Charts

References 

2022 albums
AWAL albums